Events from the year 1989 in Kuwait.

Incumbents
Emir: Jaber Al-Ahmad Al-Jaber Al-Sabah
Prime Minister: Saad Al-Salim Al-Sabah

Events

Births

 22 May - Abdulaziz Al-Mandeel.
 6 December - Hamad Aman.

References

 
Kuwait
Kuwait
Years of the 20th century in Kuwait
1980s in Kuwait